Bellium crassifolium is a daisy species in the genus Bellium. It is native to the Italian island of Sardinia.

References 

Astereae
Flora of Sardinia